The Pakch'ŏn Line is a former non-electrified standard-gauge secondary line of the Korean State Railway in Pakch'ŏn County, North P'yŏngan Province, North Korea, running from Maengjungri on the P'yŏngŭi Line to Pakch'ŏn.

History
The line was originally opened by the Chosen Government Railway on 10 December 1926. On 10 August 1946 it was nationalised by the Provisional People’s Committee for North Korea along with all other railways in the Soviet-occupied part of Korea, becoming part of the Korean State Railway.

Route
A yellow background in the "Distance" box indicates that section of the line is not electrified.

References

Railway lines in North Korea
Standard gauge railways in North Korea